CN Andromedae (CN And) is an eclipsing binary star in the constellation Andromeda. Its maximum apparent visual magnitude is 9.62 and drops down to a minimum of 10.2 during the main eclipse. It is classified as a Beta Lyrae variable with a period roughly of 0.4628 days.

System
The two stars in this system orbit very close to each other; their spectrum cannot be separated and as a whole they have a spectrum of an F5V star. The binary orbit is slowly decaying at rate 1.5*10−7 days/year. The third suspected component of the system is the red dwarf star with mass about 0.11 , at 38 years orbit around binary.

Variability
The light curve of CN Andromedae shows a primary eclipse, with its brightness dropping down to 10.21 magnitude, and a secondary one down to a magnitude of 9.9. This phenomenon repeats with a cycle of approximately 11.1 hours, with period decreasing in time due to the mass transfer from one star to the other.

References

Andromeda (constellation)
Andromedae, CN
BD+39 59
Beta Lyrae variables
J00203054+4013337
F-type main-sequence stars